Alexander Rumyantsev (born February 12, 1947, Novogeorgievsk, Kirovohrad Oblast) is a world-known pediatric hematologist, professor of the Russian Academy of Sciences, and a deputy of the 8th State Duma. In 1984, he was granted a Doctor of Sciences in Medicine degree.

In 1971,  Rumyantsev  started working as a clinical resident doctor. From 1976 to 1984, he was an assistant at the department of pediatrics. In 1986–1987, he was a professor at the department of children diseases. In 1986–1987, Rumyantsev participated in expedition trips to the affected regions of the USSR to eliminate the consequences of the Chernobyl disaster. From 2004 to 2010, Rumyantsev headed the Department of Hematology/Oncology and Immunology. In 2012, he was appointed professor of the oncology department at the Russian National Research Medical University. From 1978 to 1991, Rumyantsev was the chief pediatric hematologist at the Ministry of Health. Since September 2021, he has served as deputy of the 8th State Duma from the Moscow constituency.

Alexander Rumyantsev organized pediatric hematology and oncology service in Russia, which specializes in children diseases treatment, such as acute leukemia, lymphoma and brain tumors.

Awards  
 Order of Friendship of Peoples
 Order "For Merit to the Fatherland"
 Order of the Rising Sun

References

1947 births
Living people
United Russia politicians
21st-century Russian politicians
Eighth convocation members of the State Duma (Russian Federation)
People from Kirovohrad Oblast